Laughing Jackal Ltd is an independent video game developer, part of the Majesty House Group based in Essex, United Kingdom. Established in 2005, it has developed titles for Wii, Nintendo DS, PlayStation Portable, PlayStation Mobile, PlayStation 3 and iOS.

Games developed

Road to Vegas - Nintendo DS  - 2008
The Big Deal - Nintendo DS - 2009
Digitars: The Magnificent Flying Funfair - Nintendo DS - 2010
Mary King's Riding School 2 - Wii - 2010
Cubixx - PlayStation mini - 2010
Stellar Attack - PlayStation mini - 2010
Vibes - PlayStation mini - 2010
Card Shark - PlayStation mini - 2010
Ace Armstrong vs. The Alien Scumbags - PlayStation mini - 2010
Duæl Invaders - PlayStation mini - 2011
OMG-Z - PlayStation mini - 2011
Cubixx HD - PlayStation 3 - 2011
Fighting Fantasy: Talisman Of Death - PlayStation mini - 2011
Fighting Fantasy: The Warlock of Firetop Mountain - PlayStation mini - 2011
Orbit - PlayStation mini - 2011
Hungry Giraffe - PlayStation mini, iOS, PlayStation Vita - 2012
OMG HD Zombies - PlayStation Vita - 2013
OMG Zombies! - Windows - 2014
Flame Over - Windows, PlayStation Vita - 2015
Way of the Samurai 4 - Windows - 2015

References

External links

Majesty House Website
MCV article on Laughing Jackal
Laughing Jackal at GameSpot

Companies based in Essex
Braintree, Essex
Video game companies established in 2005
Video game development companies
Video game companies of the United Kingdom